Pennsylvania has been considered a swing state throughout its entire history as it only voted for the nationwide loser on only 10 occasions (1824, 1884, 1892, 1912, 1916, 1932, 1948, 1968, 2000, and 2004). Meaning it has voted for the national winner 83% of the time, as of 2020. Although, it generally supported Republicans between the Civil War and New Deal eras, as it voted Republican in every election between 1860 and 1932, except for 1912, when the Republican vote was split. Even then, the state's strong Republican ties meant that it backed Republican-turned-Progressive Theodore Roosevelt. The state backed a Democrat in 1936 for the first time since 1856. Pennsylvania generally leaned Democratic since the 1990s, as it backed the Democratic presidential candidate in every election since 1992 except in 2016, when it was won by Republican candidate Donald Trump with a plurality. 

In 2008, Democrat Barack Obama won the state by a margin of over 10 percent, the largest victory seen in a presidential election in Pennsylvania since Richard Nixon's victory in 1972. In 2016, Donald Trump became the first Republican presidential candidate to win Pennsylvania since George H.W. Bush in 1988, winning by a margin of 0.7 percent. In 2020, Democrat Joe Biden defeated Donald Trump in the state by 1.2 percent.

Pennsylvania currently has a split government, with the governor's office being held by a Democrat Josh Shapiro and the state house being controlled by the Democratic Party and the state senate being controlled by the Republican Party. In the United States Senate, Pennsylvania is represented by Democrats Bob Casey Jr. and John Fetterman. In the United States House of Representatives, Pennsylvania is represented by nine Democrats and eight Republicans.

Pennsylvania’s former Senator, Arlen Specter, announced in April 2009 that he was switching his party affiliation from Republican to Democratic, citing the Republicans' shift to the right since he was elected in 1980, though others suspected he switched because he would face a tough Republican primary election in 2010.  As it turned out, he ended up losing the Democratic primary to Representative Joe Sestak. Congressman Sestak narrowly lost the general election to Pat Toomey in November 2010, returning the Senate seat to Republicans.

History

Philadelphia is the Democratic stronghold of the state, often delivering huge margins for the Democrats in statewide elections.  Other urban areas, such as Pittsburgh, Erie, Harrisburg, Allentown, and Scranton lean Democratic as well. Like most states, Pennsylvania's rural areas tend to be more conservative and support Republicans. The resulting political map of Pennsylvania is therefore a red "T" in the center of the state with the Pittsburgh and Philadelphia areas a strong blue. In more recent years, the traditionally Democratic-voting areas in southwestern Pennsylvania have become much more Republican, especially after 2004, similar to other coal country areas in West Virginia and Kentucky. By 2016, counties that once voted for John Kerry in 2004 in the counties surrounding Allegheny County supported Donald Trump by more than 60%. The true swing areas of the state are the suburbs of the large cities, notably Philadelphia's collar counties and the Pittsburgh suburbs. 

On the state level, Pennsylvania has been a traditionally liberal Republican state, with a dominant state Republican Party that is much more oriented towards social spending than more conservative state Republican Parties in other regions of the United States. However, the recent Democratic trend in Pennsylvania has affected state politics, and the Democrats controlled the governor's mansion for all but four years since 2003 starting with the two terms under Governor Ed Rendell. After losing the governorship for four years to Tom Corbett from 2011 to 2015, Democratic Governor Tom Wolf defeated Corbett's re-election bid in 2014. Democrat Josh Shapiro succeeded him after the 2022 election, resulting in Democrats winning the governorship three times in a row for the first time since 1844. 

On January 22, 2018, the Supreme Court of Pennsylvania mandated that the state's congressional map be redrawn, alleging that the current map was unconstitutionally drawn to favor Republicans and disenfranchise Democratic voters, a process known as gerrymandering. Less than one month later, a new congressional map was drawn and approved. The new map would take place in the May primaries. With the new congressional map in place, Democrats had a net gain of three congressional seats, giving the Democratic Party half of Pennsylvania's congressional seats. Also in the 2018 midterm elections, Governor Tom Wolf won reelection by a margin of 17 percent, Bob Casey Jr. was reelected to a third term in the U.S. Senate, John Fetterman unseated incumbent lieutenant governor Mike Stack, and the Republican Party maintained control of the state legislature.

Federal relations
During the Tom Ridge administration, the Commonwealth of Pennsylvania maintained a permanent in-house lobbying office in Washington, D.C., to lobby the federal government of the United States. During the Ed Rendell administration, the Commonwealth closed that office and entered into a $720,000 annual contract with Blank Rome to lobby the federal government. The Rendell administration says that the contract with Blank Rome was $140,000 less per year than maintaining a permanent state office in Washington.

Pennsylvania's Federal Representation
Pennsylvania currently has 17 House districts In the 118th Congress, 9 are held by Democrats and 8 are held by Republicans. There are as follows:

Pennsylvania's 1st congressional district represented by Brian Fitzpatrick (R)
Pennsylvania's 2nd congressional district represented by Brendan Boyle (D)
Pennsylvania's 3rd congressional district represented by Dwight Evans (D)
Pennsylvania's 4th congressional district represented by Madeleine Dean (D)
Pennsylvania's 5th congressional district represented by Mary Gay Scanlon (D)
Pennsylvania's 6th congressional district represented by Chrissy Houlahan (D)
Pennsylvania's 7th congressional district represented by Susan Wild (D)
Pennsylvania's 8th congressional district represented by Matt Cartwright (D)
Pennsylvania's 9th congressional district represented by Dan Meuser (R)
Pennsylvania's 10th congressional district represented by Scott Perry (R)
Pennsylvania's 11th congressional district represented by Lloyd Smucker (R)
Pennsylvania's 12th congressional district represented by Summer Lee (D)
Pennsylvania's 13th congressional district represented by John Joyce (R)
Pennsylvania's 14th congressional district represented by Guy Reschenthaler (R)
Pennsylvania's 15th congressional district represented by Glenn Thompson (R)
Pennsylvania's 16th congressional district represented by Mike Kelly (R)
Pennsylvania's 17th congressional district represented by Chris Deluzio (D)

Pennsylvania's two United States Senators are Democrats Bob Casey Jr. and John Fetterman, serving since 2007 and 2023, respectively. 

Pennsylvania is part of the United States District Court for the Eastern District of Pennsylvania, United States District Court for the Middle District of Pennsylvania, and United States District Court for the Western District of Pennsylvania in the federal judiciary. The district's cases are appealed to the Philadelphia-based United States Court of Appeals for the Third Circuit.

See also
Government of Pennsylvania
Elections in Pennsylvania
Political party strength in Pennsylvania

References

3.^ "Correbett Could be the First Governor to lose Re-election in PA History" [Michael LaRosa, http://www.msnbc.com/hardball/corbett-could-be-first-governor-lose-re-el]

4.^ "Pennsylvania Governor Tom Corrbett loses Election" , Reid Wilson

External links